Charles Georg Lachs (1879-1972) was a Bavarian-Swedish visual artist. Specialising in oil and etching, his motifs ranged from landscapes and portraits to humble working class areas around fin de siècle Stockholm.

Biography 
Charles Lachs was born in 1879 in Örebro to Friedrichs Lachs, and Fredrika (née Lorentzon). He was the brother of Charlotte Lachs, singer, and Alice Brauner. He married Ellen Lindelöw from Ångermanland.

Lachs studied at Tekniska skolan (future Konstfack) 1894-1897, and at Konstnärsförbundets målarskola 1900. In addition, he was tutored at the etching school of Axel Tallberg, and made study travels around the United States, and the German Empire. He shared atelier with artists such as Ivar Arosenius, and John Bauer.

Lachs is represented inter alia at the National Library of Sweden, and Stockholm City Museum.

References 

 Södermalm med omnejd i bilder av Charles Lachs (Stockholmia förlag, 2009) by Alice Rasmussen
Svenskt konstnärslexikon III, p. 440 (Allhems Förlag, Malmö)
Svenska konstnärer: biografisk handbok, p. 285 (Väbo förlag, 1987)

1879 births
1972 deaths
Swedish male painters
Swedish etchers
19th-century Swedish painters
19th-century German male artists
20th-century Swedish painters
20th-century German male artists
Swedish portrait painters
Swedish landscape painters
German male painters
German etchers
19th-century German painters
20th-century German painters
German portrait painters
German landscape painters
19th-century Swedish male artists
20th-century Swedish male artists